Karacasu is a town (belde) in the Bolu District, Bolu Province, Turkey. Its population is 2,197 (2021). It is situated  far from Bolu to the north of Köroğlu Mountains. The town's economy depends on thermal springs.

References

Populated places in Bolu District
Towns in Turkey